Halgerda dichromis is a species of sea slug, a dorid nudibranch, shell-less marine gastropod mollusks in the family Discodorididae.

Distribution
This species was described from a single specimen collected in Durban Harbour, South Africa. It has subsequently been found on several occasions on the KwaZulu-Natal coast and at Brazen Head, Transkei.

References

Endemic fauna of South Africa
Discodorididae
Gastropods described in 1999